Enigmatic : Calling is the third studio album by the Norwegian progressive metal band Pagan's Mind.

According to the liner notes, Enigmatic : Calling was inspired by "a number of great thinkers, philosophers, scientists, writers, and film directors," including Erich von Däniken, Albert Einstein, and Steven Spielberg. Some of the lyrics address "the idea that mankind was originally created, constructed, and placed here on Earth as a genetically modified species created as a project by 'aliens'."

Track listing

 The CD also includes an MPEG video clip for "Enigmatic Mission".

Personnel

Pagan's Mind
 Nils K. Rue – lead vocals, cover art concept, artwork, logo, and booklet background designs
 Jørn Viggo Lofstad – guitar
 Steinar Krokmo – bass
 Stian Kristoffersen – drums
 Ronny Tegner – keyboards

Additional musicians
 Espen Mjøen – backing vocals

Production
 Recorded by Espen Mjøen at Mediamaker Studio, Skien, Norway in September–December 2004.
 Vocals recorded at Images & Words Studio, Skien, Norway in November–December 2004.
 Guitar solos on "New World Order" and "Enigmatic Mission" recorded by Christian Clausen.
 Edited by John Nilsson at Studio Fredman.
 Mixed by Fredrik Nordström and Patrik J. Sten at Studio Fredman, Gothenburg, Sweden in February 2005.
 Mastered by Morten Lund at Masterhuset, Oslo, Norway in February 2005.
 Front cover "Goddess" photo by Per Stian Johnsen.
 Photos by Thomas Fjelldalen.

Pagan's Mind albums
2005 albums
Concept albums
Limb Music albums